Ighil may refer to:

Ighil, Algeria
Ighil, Morocco